Pony is the debut studio album by the English psychedelic rock band Spratleys Japs. Released in 1999 on All My Eye And Betty Martin Music, the album was a side-project of Cardiacs frontman Tim Smith and his then-partner Joanne Spratley. Although other musicians are credited as playing on the album, it is believed that this was part of an elaborate fictional conceit, and that in fact Smith and Spratley were the only musicians to have been involved with the recording.

Recording
According to the history of the album presented on the All My Eye and Betty Martin website, Pony was conceived as the result of an encounter between Spratley and a displaced American bar band called The Rev-Ups (Heidi Murphy, Mark Donovan and Viv Sherrif), in a dilapidated recording studio in The New Forest. Spratley subsequently introduced Smith to the band, and work began on recording an album in the Autumn of 1998. However, as there is no apparent evidence that the band nor the studio have ever existed, the veracity of this story is in doubt. A further reference was made to the alleged New Forest studio ("Sparrow Wars") on the 2007 album Yoni by Ginger Wildheart which was produced by Tim Smith, where Smith allegedly recorded a church organ for the track "Smile in Denial".

The sound of Pony was apparently inspired by a malfunctioning Mellotron that had been lent to Smith by Mellotron enthusiast Andy Thompson, and the instrument in question features on nearly every track of the album.

Lyrical references
Pony shares a number of reference points with the contemporaneous Cardiacs album Guns, including many lyrics sourced from the famously mis-translated 19th century Portuguese-English phrasebook English as She Is Spoke. For example, the lyric of the song "Oh" is based entirely around text from the "Familiar Dialogues" chapter of the book, incorporating phrases such as "It seems me that the corn does push already", and "The field has by me a thousand charms".

Label
Pony was the first release through Smith's own label All My Eye and Betty Martin Music, and is catalogued as AME CD001. As the album was only distributed by direct mail order it was never sold in any retail outlets, and was historically exceedingly difficult to acquire due to Tim Smith's ill health. However, two tracks, "Cabinet" and "Hazel", were included on the Org Records compilation album, Songs By Cardiacs And Affectionate Friends, released in 2002.

Pony is now once again available to order via the Cardiacs webstore

Track listing
All songs written by Tim Smith.

Track 09 is not listed on the back of the CD due to a typographical error.

Personnel
Joanne Spratley – Vocals, Flugelhorn, Theremin
Tim Smith - Vocals, Bass Guitar, Piano, Organ
Heidi Murphy - Synthesiser, Mellotron, Electronics
Viv Sherrif - Drums, Organ
Mark Donovan - Guitars
Andrew Dack - Designer(synthesisers)
Juliette Randall - Designer(electronics)
Nevergreen Symphonia - Orchestral Parts on 'Oh'
Wendy Barry - Conductor

References

External links
 Spratleys Japs homepage

1998 albums